South Williamson is a census-designated place (CDP) in the Appalachian Mountains of northeastern Pike County, Kentucky, United States, on the border with West Virginia. It is separated from Williamson, West Virginia by the Tug Fork River.

The South Williamson area includes the surrounding Kentucky communities of Goody, Forest Hills, Toler, and Belfry. In 1990s, residents of the area voted down a proposal to incorporate the area. Another incorporation attempt was proposed in 2015 and the name Johnsonville was proposed for the new incorporated town.

The local economy is largely fueled by coal mining, transportation, health care, and retail.

Southside Mall is located in South Williamson.

History

In the late 19th century, Pike County and bordering Mingo County, West Virginia provided the setting for the Hatfield-McCoy feud, a bitter feud waged between two feuding families between 1878 and 1891 that has become American history.

Flooding
South Williamson is protected by a floodwall, built by the US Army Corps of Engineers in response to a devastating flood along the Tug Fork River in 1977. There have only been two uses of the gates thus far; the first occurred in 2002 during a major flood in the region, and the second in 2003, due to anticipation of the rising river getting higher.

Geography
South Williamson is located at  (37.67059, -82.28465).

Healthcare
South Williamson is the location of Appalachian Regional Healthcare's Tug Valley Regional Medical Center.

Schools
Belfry Elementary
Belfry Middle
Belfry High School

References

External links
WYMT NEWS
Appalachian News Express
ARH HOSPITAL South Williamson

Census-designated places in Pike County, Kentucky
Census-designated places in Kentucky